The 1894 American Cup was the tenth edition of the soccer tournament organized by the American Football Association. The Fall River Olympics won their second title by defeating the Paterson True Blues in the final. This season the elected committee was William Turner as President, William W. Douglas as Vice President, James Henderson as Secretary, and Ephraim Mayes of the Olympics as Treasurer. The committee selected the Thomlinson's patent football as the official ball to be used in all cup games.

Participants

Western Division:
 Americus Athletic AssociationHoboken, New Jersey
 Centreville A.C.Bayonne, New Jersey
 ThistleNew York
 CaledoniansNewark, New Jersey
 Greenpoint ThistleBrooklyn, New York
 ThistlePaterson, New Jersey
 True BluesPaterson, New Jersey
 WondersKearny, New Jersey

Eastern Division:
 East EndsFall River, Massachusetts
 OlympicsFall River, Massachusetts
 RoversFall River, Massachusetts
 Free WanderersPawtucket, Rhode Island
 Young Men's Christian AssociationPawtucket, Rhode Island

First round
The first round draw took place at the AFA meeting at Newark, New Jersey on September 2, 1893. The games of the first round were scheduled to be played on or before the third Saturday in October. Olympics drew a bye. 

East Ends: GK Murtaugh, FB Jennings, Fagan, HB Scott, Stanton, Cunliffe, LW Andrews, Foley, C Keavey, RW Melia, Nixon. Y.M.C.A.: GK McLay, FB Whipple, Ellison, HB Scorer, Meiklejohn, Moore, LW Holburn, Cochrane, C Leggett, RW J.Moore, Cameron.

True Blues: GK S.Simpson, FB J.Lockman(c), F.Binks, HB R.Garner, J.Henshell, Joe Upton, FW Tommy Turner, Jimmy Cochren, L.Dodson, E.Ackerman, Jimmy Counsell. Greenpoint: GK A.Allison, FB T.Foy, J.McKee, HB A.Graham, J.Coffee, M.C.Rice, FW J.Ward, C.Gorvin, R.Donaldson(c), J.Connell, M.Brady.

Thistle forfeited.

Americus: GK R.Galliant, FB G.Seller, H.Gregory, HB E.Koch, F.Rolker, R.Gallup, FW B.Fisk, William Gill, T.Bright, J.Ayres, O.Alces. Centreville: GK C.Bauer, FB W.Jeffs, A.Wilson, HB M.Byrnes, H.Fitzpatrick, J.Fitzpatrick, FW J.Campbell, F.Oliver, R.Talbot, J.Spavin, G.Spavin.

Free Wanderers: G J.Shea, FB Gregory, Jack Stuart, HB Reed, Johnson, Puleston, RW Whiteside, Davis, LW Jeffrey(c), Watson, C Al Jenkins. Rovers: GK Dennis Shea, FB Buckley, Culligan, HB Pickup, Fortin, Legrosse, LW Harrington, Borden, C Pemberton, RW Farrell, Gavan.

Caledonians: GK I.Smith, FB W.Patrick, R.McDonald, HB F.McDonald(c), T.Shaw, J.Brown, RW J.Hill, R.Gibson, LW A.McGee, T.Kelley, C Hoburn. Thistle: GK G.Wilkie, FB W.Alexander, M.Stewart, HB S.Finlay, J.Finlay, J.O'Neil, LW M.McAulay, H.Lander, RW J.Ingram, J.Turner, C W.Turner.

replays 

Caledonians: GK Smith, FB L.Shaw, R.McDonald, HB F.McDonald(c), Britchford, Brown, FW Hill, Barton, McGee, Evans, Downs. Thistle: GK Wilkie, FB Alexander, Stewart, HB S.Finlay, T.Finlay, T.Turner, FW McAulay, Launder, J.Ingraham, G.Turner, Jameson.

East Ends: GK Cornell, FB Jennings, Fagan, HB Scott, Daley, Cunliffe, LW Andrews, Foley, C Keavy, RW Melia, Nixon. Reserve KayY.M.C.A.: GK McLay, FB Whipple, Ellison, HB Scorer, Meiklejohn, Moore, LW Helliborne, Leggett, C Cameron, RW J.Moore, Corcoran.

Second round
The East Ends drew a second round bye.

Olympics: GK Irving, FB Hughes, Farrell, HB Burgess, Moores, Whitaker, RW Tobin, Dummell, LW Sunderland, Kenny, C Barlow. Rovers: GK Shea, FB Buckley, Culligan, HB Fortin, Pickup, Legrosse, LW Borden, Harrington, C Pemberton, RW Farrell, Gavin.

Wonders did not show. Game awarded to Caledonians.

Americus: GK R.Galliant, FB G.Seller, G.Raleston, HB E.Koch, H.L.Walker, G.Johnston, FW W.McFarland, J.L.Douglas, T.Bright, D.B.Fisk, O.Alces. True Blues: GK Sam Templeton, FB J.Henshell, F.Binks, HB R.Garner, J.Worsley, E.Ackerman, FW L.Dodson, Ralph Hall, T.Phillibin, J.Upton, T.Turner.

Semifinals 

Caledonians: GK J.Smith, FB O.Dawson, W.Patrick, HB F.McDonald(c), F.Bridgford, W.Shaw, LW G.Weston, G.McGee, C W.Deegan, RW R.Brown, J.Barton. True Blues: GK Sam Templeton, FB S.Logan, F.Binks, HB W.Barr, Ralph Hall, E.Ackerman, FW Len Dodson, R.Garner, C Tom Phillibin, LW J.Upton, T.Turner.

East Ends: GK Simester, FB Jennings, Fagan, HB Scott, P.Stanton, Cunliffe, LW Andrews, Bannister, C Melia, RW P.Murtaugh, J.Murtaugh. Olympics: GK Irving, FB Hughes, Spencer, HB Burgess, Moores, Whittaker, RW Kenney, Sunderland, LW Dummell, Tobin(c), C Barlow.

Final  

Olympics: GK Jim Irving, FB Hughes, Burgess, HB Barlow, Moores, Whittaker, LW Kenney, Sunderland, RW Dummell, Tobin(c), C Spencer. True Blues: GK Allen, FB Luckerman, F.Binks, HB Henshall, Ralph Hall, E.Ackerman, RW Len Dodson, R.Garner, C Tom Phillibin, LW J.Upton, T.Turner.

References 

1894